David James Ryan (23 January 1885 – 13 February 1957) was an Australian rules footballer who played for Geelong and Collingwood in the Victorian Football League (VFL).

Originally from Yarrawonga, Ryan arrived at Collingwood in 1907 after failing to make an impact in his season with Geelong. At his new club, Ryan participated in the finals in each of his first five seasons and was a ruckman in the 1910 premiership team. He also played in Collingwood's losing Grand Final the following season, again as a follower. Used at times up forward, he retired at the end of the 1912 season but continued playing briefly in the VFA at Prahran.

He was the brother of another Collingwood player Michael Ryan and the uncle of Joe Ryan, who played for and coached Footscray. Outside of football he was a policeman for about 20 years until he moved to Sydney around 1930 where he worked as a store detective. He died in Sydney in February 1957.

References

Holmesby, Russell and Main, Jim (2007). The Encyclopedia of AFL Footballers. 7th ed. Melbourne: Bas Publishing.

External links

1885 births
Australian rules footballers from Victoria (Australia)
Geelong Football Club players
Collingwood Football Club players
Collingwood Football Club Premiership players
Prahran Football Club players
Yarrawonga Football Club players
1957 deaths
One-time VFL/AFL Premiership players